Ronald L. Smith is a children's book author. He is the author of Hoodoo (2015), The Mesmerist (2017), Black Panther: The Young Prince (2018), The owls have come to take us away (2019), and Gloom Town (2020). For Hoodoo, Smith won the American Library Association's Coretta Scott King/John Steptoe Award for New Talent.

Early life 
Smith was born in Maine to a military family that moved frequently; he also lived in Japan, Alabama, Michigan, Washington, DC, South Carolina, and Delaware, among other places. His love of fantasy and science fiction novels began as a child, but he first worked as a writer in advertising before turning to writing children's fiction.

Fiction career 
Smith published his first book, Hoodoo, with Clarion Books in 2015. Set in the 1930s Alabama, Hoodoo earned Smith the American Library Association's Coretta Scott King/John Steptoe Award for New Talent.

Smith's second book, The Mesmerist (Clarion Books, 2017), is set in London at the turn of the century.

In January 2018, Smith published a children's novel for Marvel Comics featuring Marvel's superhero Black Panther. The book, Black Panther: The Young Prince, was released just prior to Marvel's Black Panther film. Reviewing the book in the Bulletin of the Center for Children's Literature, Kate Quealy-Gainer wrote, "Fans will notice allusions to T'Challa's future adventures as the ruling Black Panther, but even the comic-book averse will relate to T'Challa's negotiating of middle-school dynamics and may also appreciate his cleverness as he faces down his enemies." The School Library Journal named the book to a list of eight fantasy "must-reads" featuring a black protagonist; their January 2018 review called it a "must-purchase for all collections."

Personal life 
Smith lives in Baltimore.

References

External links 

 Official site
 

Living people
Marvel Comics writers
American children's writers
Writers from Baltimore
Writers from Maine
American fantasy writers
African-American novelists
21st-century American writers
Year of birth missing (living people)